The 2022–23 Biathlon World Cup – Sprint Men started on 3 December 2022 in Kontiolahti and will conclude on 16 March 2023 in Oslo Holmenkollen.

Competition format 
The  sprint race is the third oldest biathlon event; the distance is skied over three laps. The biathlete shoots two times at any shooting lane, first prone, then standing, totalling 10 targets. Competitors' starts are staggered, normally by 30 seconds.

2022–23 Top 3 standings

Events summary

Standings 
Intermediate standings after 5 competitions.

References 

Sprint Men